Owen Da Gama  (born 18 August 1961) is a South African former footballer and manager. He previously managed Platinum Stars as well as Orlando Pirates.

Playing career
Born in Volksrust, Da Gama began his playing career with Arcadia Shepherds F.C. Juniors u15, Colchester United (NPSL), Pretoria Callies and Dynamos where he moved to with Pretoria Callies Danish coach, the late Kai Johansson. Johansson and Dan Manuel arranged for trials at Belgian club Beerschot in 1985, where he signed a three-year deal.

Soon after, he was loaned out to League of Ireland team Derry City for the 1985–86 season. During his time at Derry City, he won the League of Ireland First Division Shield where he scored a hat trick in the final and the League of Ireland First Division where he was top goal scorer of the club and league. Da Gama was also named the PFAI First Division Player of the Year for the 1985–86 season and made a permanent move. Da Gama was the only player in Ireland with his own Fan Club.

He was than snapped up in 1989 by Spanish First Division Club Figueres. He was refused a work permit due to the Sports Embargo by the Spanish government on all South Africans. Da Gama was lured back to South Africa by the wealthy club owner Errol Hughes of Leeds United as player/coach where Leeds escaped relegation and went on to the BOBSAVE semi finals against Orlando Pirates in 1989 which Leeds lost on penalties.

At the end of that season Da Gama was signed by Moroka Swallows a move orchestrated by Abdul Bhamjee and David Pine Chabeli. He scored two goals and assisted in two more in a 5–1 victory against Mamelodi Sundowns in the 1989 Bob Save Super Bowl final replay and was named as Player of the Series. Swallows went on to win the Top Eight the following season as well as retaining the Bob Save Super Bowl in 1990. Some references being made as the best Swallows team ever.

Da Gama ended his playing career due to a serious knee injury while with Dynamos with whom he won the JPS Cup in 1990.

Coaching career
Da Gama began coaching at his former club Dynamos with whom he had two spells. Firstly in 1992 under a Venda-based Consortium he took the club from second bottom position to finish third on the log. His second spell was with the new owner Peter Rabali when the club won promotion to the Premier Soccer League in 1996. He moved to Silver Stars in 1998, guiding them to promotion from the Vodacom League to the National First Division at the first attempt. He was forced to leave the club at the end of that season in order to attend to his IT business in Pretoria. During this time, he coached and co-owned PSM Parkhurst in the Vodacom League and the club finished second on the log and formed part of the new Gauteng Vodacom League.

In 2000, Da Gama rejoined Silver Stars for a second spell, with the team choosing to train in Johannesburg and only travel to Venda for their matches. Under his management, the team won 9 of their 11 matches and avoided relegation from the National First Division. In the 2003 ABSA Cup, Silver Stars famously beat Orlando Pirates 2–0 in the second-round before losing to Jomo Cosmos in the quarter-finals. Silver Stars achieved promotion to the Premier Soccer League at the end of the 2002–03 season. The club achieved an 11th-place finish in their debut campaign in the PSL and reached the Coca-Cola Cup Final, losing 2–0 to Kaizer Chiefs. He was named as PSL Coach of the Season at the end of the 2005–06 season. Da Gama led Silver Stars to victory in the 2006 Telkom Knockout Cup with Simba Marumo scoring a first-half hat-trick in a 3–1 win against Ajax Cape Town at the Atteridgeville Super Stadium. In the 2006–07 season, Silver Stars finished 2nd in the league and managed to achieve a place in the 2008 CAF Champions League.

In September 2007, he replaced Bibey Mutombo as the head coach of Orlando Pirates after 6 games of the season and the team at the bottom of the league standings. After only eight months in charge have taken over The Buccaneers ended Da Gama's only season in charge in 8th place - Da Gama quit the club in June 2008. He joined Free State Stars Da Gama joins Free State Stars as Director of Coaching and briefly takes over as stand in coach after David Duncan was fired. Da Gama resigned in October 2008.,. He joined Bloemfontein Celtic in December 2008, with the club in last place on the table and managed to help the team from bottom of the log to finish 14th in the 2008–09 season, avoiding the relegation play-offs thanks to goal difference. Da Gama led them to an improvement in the following season as they finished 6th. He left the club in July 2010.

Da Gama rejoined Platinum Stars in August 2010. He guided the team to a 10th-place finish in the 2010–11 season after the club had ended the previous season in 14th position, during a crucial rebuilding phase with a budget cut of more than 40 percent.Da Gama joined Dynamos in November 2012 with the club winless after 6 matches and at the bottom of the National First Division log. He started by getting their first league win away to Santos (Cape Town) 1–0 and an impressive Cup win over log leaders Mpumalanga Black Aces 3–1, but left the club after only four months, in March 2013 with still 15 matches to play. He coached the
He later became the head coach of Highlands Park F.C.and took over the club after 5 matches in the NFD. Highlands Park had lost the last three matches. Da Gama went unbeaten in the remaining 25 league matches, breaking several records. Most matches won, most points, most goals scored, least matches lost as well as best goal difference. After winning promotion to the PSL, Da Gama took Highlands Park to the to a Top 8 finish and the following season to the Top 8 Final, losing 1-0 to SuperSport United. Highlands Park was sold to Tim Sukazi and renamed TS Galaxy. Da Gama later joined TS Galaxy languishing at the bottom of the log. He amassed 18 points in a short space of time and lost out a Top 8 position on goal difference to Bloemfontein Celtics. Da Gama joined Sekhukhune as Co Coach to Macdonald Makhubedu on a short stint with 5 matches remaining. May Highlands Park.

Style of play
Da Gama played as a striker.

Honours
 League of Ireland First Division: 1
 Derry City F.C. 1986–87
 League of Ireland First Division Shield: 1
 Derry City F.C. 1985–86
BoBsave Champions Moroka Swallows 1998
Rothmans Cup winner Moroka Swallows 1989

References

External links
 The Owen da Gama fan club and Derry City's explosion onto the League of Ireland scene

1961 births
Living people
People from Pixley ka Seme Local Municipality
White South African people
South African people of Portuguese descent
South African soccer players
South African expatriate soccer players
South African soccer managers
Association football forwards
Derry City F.C. players
League of Ireland players
Expatriate association footballers in the Republic of Ireland
South African expatriate sportspeople in Ireland
Moroka Swallows F.C. players
K. Beerschot V.A.C. players
Belgian Pro League players
Orlando Pirates F.C. managers
Platinum Stars F.C. managers
Free State Stars F.C. managers
Expatriate footballers in Belgium
South African expatriate sportspeople in Belgium
Dynamos F.C. (South Africa) players
Dynamos F.C. (South Africa) managers
Pretoria Callies F.C. players